The Faraday Building is in the south-west of the City of London. It was originally built as a sorting office for the General Post Office. In 1902 it was converted to a telephone exchange serving sections of London, and underwent several capacity expansions over the next several years.

In 1933, a new section was added on the western side of the building, over doubling the size of the building as a whole. The section was built to house the International Telephone Exchange. The new section included a raised central portion with decorative turrets which was highly controversial at the time as it blocked the view of St. Paul's Cathedral from the Thames River. This led to a new law that restricted the height of new buildings in London to protect the sightlines of the Cathedral.

Although generally five stories high, the central section and rectangular turrets roughly double that and remain a high point in the area in spite of a century of new building in the area. It fronts Queen Victoria Street and backs onto Knightrider Street.  The block is one narrow block east from Peters Hill which is the northern footpath to/from the Millennium Bridge.

BT Group still uses the building, although today it is rented as general offices and retail space.

History
The building began as 'Central' telephone exchange at the Post Office Savings Bank at Queen Victoria Street, opening for business on 1 March 1902 with just 200 subscribers. The present building, originally known as Faraday House, was designed by the architect A. R. Myers for the Office of Works and completed in 1933. It stands on the site of Doctors' Commons whose members had lower-courts say in ecclesiastical (including, during its currency, probate) and admiralty matters.

Take-up of the telephone by the public was very quick so that by 1905 the exchange capacity was extended to 10,000 subscribers, and full capacity was exhausted just three years later. To meet the growing demand from businesses in the City, a new common battery exchange was installed in 1906 with a capacity of 15,000 lines. This became 'City' exchange and officially opened in November 1907. In common with other exchanges in London, Central was able to connect subscribers to the Electrophone exchange at Gerard Street. This allowed people to listen to performances at certain London theatres and music halls while sitting at home.

In 1933, the international telephone exchange was opened at Faraday. In 1935, an automatic exchange was opened with more than 6,000 working lines. The complex task of switching subscribers over to the new exchange involved 60 engineers working for more than 15 months.

Architecture and streetscape
The building is cream-coloured. It has one-bay chamfered corners on its east side (Godliman Street) which mean the footprint of the building is, at fine level, an irregular hexagon rather than its general form of a slightly tapering rectangle. Its southwestern quarter hosts bays that rise (a further five) to ten storeys, with rectangular turrets and recessed upper storeys. The windows across the western "half" of the building give away its on average lower ceiling height and this section slightly projects (from the rest of the main, long, façade).

One building is attached, № 146 Queen Victoria Street, which matches in colour and has been adapted as a place of Scientology training.

The construction of the Faraday Building obscured the riverside view of upper parts of St Paul's Cathedral. This led directly to regulations protecting views to and from the dome from a number of vantage points by restricting the height of new buildings constructed in certain designated areas. The City of London School and another telephone exchange, Baynard House, were built between the riverside and Faraday Building but are restricted in height to just three levels above ground.

References

Buildings and structures in the City of London
British Telecom buildings and structures
History of telecommunications in the United Kingdom
Infrastructure in London
Telephone exchange buildings